is a Japanese footballer. He is a defender.

He signed for Albirex Niigata (S) in 2015 after graduating from Kansai University. He subsequently renewed his contract in 2016. He has played in Australia.

Club career statistics
As of Jan 2, 2017

References

1992 births
Living people
Japanese footballers
Singapore Premier League players
Albirex Niigata Singapore FC players
Association football forwards
Kansai University alumni
Japanese expatriate footballers
Expatriate soccer players in Australia
Expatriate footballers in Singapore